The 1984 Cologne Cup, also known as the Cologne Grand Prix, was a men's tennis tournament played on indoor carpet courts in Cologne, West Germany that was part of the 1984 Volvo Grand Prix circuit. It was the ninth edition of the tournament and was held from 15 October through 21 October 1984. First-seeded Joakim Nyström won the singles title.

Finals

Singles
 Joakim Nyström defeated  Miloslav Mečíř 7–6, 6–2
 It was Nyström's 1st singles title of the year and the 5th of his career.

Doubles
 Wojciech Fibak /  Sandy Mayer defeated  Jan Gunnarsson /  Joakim Nyström 6–3, 6–4

References

External links
 ITF tournament edition details

Cologne Cup
Cologne Cup